Jaílson França Braz or simply Bia (born June 15, 1981) is a Brazilian footballer who plys as a defensive midfielder.

Honours
 Campeonato Pernambucano in 2006, 2007 and 2008 with Sport Club do Recife
 Copa do Brasil in 2008 with Sport Club do Recife

External links
 Sport Club do Recife Official Site
 sambafoot
 CBF
 zerozero.pt

1981 births
Living people
Brazilian footballers
Associação Desportiva Confiança players
Sport Club do Recife players
Association football midfielders